"Monsters" is a song performed by Finnish singer-songwriter Saara Aalto. It was released to digital retailers and streaming platforms on 9 February 2018 by Warner Music Finland. The song was written by Aalto, Joy Deb, Linnea Deb and Ki Fitzgerald.

It was one of three songs competing in Uuden Musiikin Kilpailu 2018, the Finnish national selection process for the Eurovision Song Contest 2018, and won the competition. It represented Finland in the Eurovision Song Contest 2018. The song is about befriending your enemies.

Eurovision Song Contest

In November 2017, at a press conference for Uuden Musiikin Kilpailu 2018, it was announced that Saara Aalto would represent Finland at the Eurovision Song Contest 2018 and her song was selected through Uuden Musiikin Kilpailu 2018. The competition featured three songs that were all performed by Aalto. The show took place on 3 March 2018 at Espoo Metro Areena in Espoo, hosted by Krista Siegfrids and Mikko Silvennoinen. The winning song was determined by public voting and from votes from international jury panels. The song finished 25th in the contest.

Track listing

Charts

Release history

References

2018 songs
2018 singles
Eurovision songs of 2018
Eurovision songs of Finland
Saara Aalto songs
Songs written by Joy Deb
Songs written by Linnea Deb
Songs written by Ki Fitzgerald
Warner Music Finland singles
English-language Finnish songs